Theodoor Cornelis (Theo) van Boven (born 16 May 1934, Voorburg) is a Dutch jurist and professor emeritus in international law.

In 1977, he was appointed director of the United Nations' Division for Human Rights, a precursor of the UN Human Rights Office.

From 1986 to 1991, he was the UN's Special Rapporteur on the Right to Reparation to Victims of Gross Violations of Human Rights and, from 2001 to 2004,  Special Rapporteur on Torture. He is also a member of the International Commission of Jurists. From February 1994 to December 1994, he was the first registrar of the International Criminal Tribunal for the former Yugoslavia.

In 1985, he was awarded the Right Livelihood Award for "speaking out on human rights abuse without fear or favour in the international community", in 2004, the Wateler Peace Prize and in 2013, the Light of Truth Award. From 1995 to 2016 he was jury member of the Nuremberg International Human Rights Award.
 
On 16 December 2005, the United Nations General Assembly adopted the resolution 60/147, titled 'Basic Principles and Guidelines on the Right to a Remedy and Reparation for Victims of Gross Violations of International Human Rights Law and Serious Violations of International Humanitarian Law'. These principles are largely inspired from the work of Van Boven and Cherif Bassiouni and are known as the Van Boven/Bassiouni Principles.

In November 2009, he was given a doctorate honoris causa from the University of Buenos Aires.

Van Boven has stated his support for the Campaign for the Establishment of a United Nations Parliamentary Assembly, an organisation which advocates for democratic reform in the United Nations, and the creation of a more accountable international political system.

Documentary film
He is starring the documentary film The Subversives. The plot centers about his job as director of UN Human Rights affaires of the late 70s and early 80s. The film tells his commitment for the many thousands of disappearances and refugees, his actions against military dictatorships and his facing with UN Secretary General Javier Pérez de Cuéllar.

Further reading
Introductory note on the General Assembly resolution 60/147 of 16 December 2005 (Basic Principles and Guidelines on the Right to a Remedy and Reparation for Victims of Gross Violations of International Human Rights Law and Serious Violations of International Humanitarian Law) in the Historic Archives of the United Nations Audiovisual Library of International Law

Report of the special rapporteur on the question of torture, Theo van Boven, on his visit to Spain Published February 2004.

References

External links
BASIC PRINCIPLES AND GUIDELINES ON THE RIGHT TO A REMEDY AND REPARATION FOR VICTIMS OF VIOLATIONS OF INTERNATIONAL HUMAN RIGHTS AND HUMANITARIAN LAW ("Van Boven Principles")
The Basic Principles and Guidelines on the Historic Archives of the  UN Audiovisual Library of International Law, with an introductory note by Theo van Boven
Prof. mr. dr. T.C. van Boven, 1934 - at the Amsterdam University Album Academicum

1934 births
Living people
Dutch jurists
United Nations Special Rapporteurs on torture
Leiden University alumni
Academic staff of the University of Amsterdam
Academic staff of Maastricht University
Commanders of the Order of Orange-Nassau
Recipients of the Order of the Liberator General San Martin
International Criminal Tribunal for the former Yugoslavia officials
People from Voorburg
People from Leidschendam-Voorburg
Dutch officials of the United Nations